"Bartender" is a song recorded by British singer-songwriter James Blunt. It was released on 10 March 2017 as the second single from his fifth studio album The Afterlove (2017). The song was written by James Blunt, Teddy Geiger, Steph Jones and Daniel Parker.

Music video
An accompanying music video directed by Declan Whitebloom was released onto YouTube on 10 March 2017 at a total length of three minutes and twenty-nine seconds.

Track listing

Charts

Release history

References

2017 songs
James Blunt songs
Songs written by Danny Parker (songwriter)
Songs written by James Blunt
Songs written by Teddy Geiger
Songs written by Steph Jones